The sun lark (Galerida modesta) or Nigerian sun lark, is a species of lark in the family Alaudidae. Its range extends mainly across the Sudan region (south of the Sahel), from Guinea to South Sudan. Its natural habitats are dry savannah and subtropical or tropical dry lowland grassland.

Taxonomy and systematics

Subspecies 
Four subspecies are recognized: 
 G. m. modesta - Heuglin, 1864: Found from Burkina Faso and northern Ghana east to southern Sudan
 Fouta-Djallon sun lark (G. m. nigrita) - (Grote, 1920): Found in Senegal, Gambia, Guinea, Sierra Leone and southern Mali
 Ngaundere sun lark (G. m. struempelli, also as G. m. saturata, G. m. strumpelli and G. m. strümpelli) - (Reichenow, 1910): Originally classified as a separate species in genus Mirafra. Found in Cameroon
 Uele sun lark (G. m. bucolica) - (Hartlaub, 1887): Originally classified as a separate species in genus Mirafra. Found in south-eastern Central African Republic, north-eastern Democratic Republic of Congo and extreme north-western Uganda

References

sun lark
Birds of Sub-Saharan Africa
sun lark
Taxa named by Theodor von Heuglin
Taxonomy articles created by Polbot